The Universe Smiles Upon You is the debut studio album by American musical trio Khruangbin. It was released November 6, 2015 under Night Time Stories label.

Critical reception

Max Savage Levenson of Paste reviewed The Universe Smiles Upon You is "a subtle dance, a constellation of small movements and highly nuanced arrangements that unfolds seamlessly, like ripples on the water." Peter Helman of Stereogum said "The album is something both groove-heavy and dreamy, and it absolutely evokes the deep-in-the-wilderness".

Track listing

Personnel
Khruangbin
Laura Lee - bass, vocals
Mark Speer - guitar, percussion, vocals
Donald "DJ" Johnson – drums
Additional musician
Wilhelm Van Horn - pedal steel guitar

References

2015 debut albums
Khruangbin albums
Night Time Stories albums